The Jardin des Arômes is a botanical garden specializing in aromatic plants, located along the Promenade de la Digue, Nyons, Drôme, Rhône-Alpes, France. It is open daily; admission is free.

The garden was created in 1983 on the banks of the river Eygues, and now contains about 200 types of aromatic and medicinal plants, including cedar, Cercis siliquastrum, chestnut, cypress, juniper, olive trees, pine, and rosemary, thyme, and viburnum. It is now in a state of neglect.

See also 
 List of botanical gardens in France

References 
 Jardin des Arômes
 ProvenceWeb description
 Gralon.net entry (French)
 Je Decouvre la France entry (French)
 52we entry (French)

Gardens in Drôme
Botanical gardens in France